Jindalee Shire was a local government area in the Riverina region of New South Wales, Australia.

Jindalee Shire was proclaimed on 7 March 1906 as Cowcumballa Shire, one of 134 shires created after the passing of the Local Government (Shires) Act 1905. It was renamed Jindalee Shire on 13 March 1907. On 17 September 1935, it absorbed part of the abolished Municipality of Wallendbeen. 

Initially, the shire shared an office with the Municipality of Cootamundra until moving into their own offices elsewhere in Cootamundra in 1946. Urban areas in the shire included Stockinbingal, Wallendbeen and the village of Frampton

The shire amalgamated with the Municipality of Cootamundra to form Cootamundra Shire on 1 April 1975.

References

Former local government areas of New South Wales
1906 establishments in Australia
1975 disestablishments in Australia